Sotik Constituency is an electoral constituency in Kenya established for the 1997 elections. It is one of five constituencies in Bomet County. Sotik has one major river, River Kipsonoi. Sotik is also a hilly place with the main crops being grown are tea and maize. The Nairobi Kisii highway passes through Sotik. Recently, many developments have occurred; Sotik Market was put up by the former governor Hon Isaac Ruto, since then infrastructure has been improving. Sotik is also a religious center with over 10 churches set up in the area, e.g., Bethel AGC, St Joseph's Sotik Catholic Church, Lawrence Kerich etc.

History
Sotik would have been Abagusii and Maasai territory before 1800 but with a treaty put forward by Menya arap Kisiara, the Maasai migrated to Narok; and in the 1830s the arrival of the three sons of arap Turgat from Nandi; led to a forceful and violent eviction of the Abagusii from the reaches of Bureti (Kapkatet), to Keroka which has a meaning of 'look at home' in Kipsigis dialect.

The arrival of the three sons of arap Turgat was followed by the arrival of the British and the Kipsigis rallied alongside the Nandi and resisted the construction of the Uganda railway; which upon the death of Koitalel and by the agenda of the church against the Orgoik, the Kipsigis signed the Lumbwa Treaty which saw the end of their resistance against the British.

Sotik in its initial status was a stretch of plains where big game was practiced. It is in American records that America's 26th President:- Theodore Roosevelt Jr. liked to use the 405 Winchester centerfire rifle cartridge and on occasion killed lions. 
Sotik later became an agricultural district producing: Tea, Pyrethrum, Cotton, maize and dairy products.

Sotik is understood by the Belgut Kipsigis to be a general term for Bomet and its residents (Usually derogative as Bomet Kipsigis, especially those from Trans-Mara are seen to be primitive and conservative- An attitude with roots from Lubwa treaty). This is because Bomet town used to be called Sot, only to be changed to Bomet because it used to host an industry scale slaughter house during early post Independence period.

Members of Parliament

Wards

See also 

 Bomet Central Constituency
 Chepalungu Constituency
 Konoin Constituency
 Bomet East Constituency

References 

Constituencies in Bomet County
Buret District
Constituencies in Rift Valley Province
1997 establishments in Kenya
Constituencies established in 1997